Ideal was an American R&B quartet from Houston, Texas, United States. The group debuted in 1999 and was composed of brothers Maverick "Mav" and Cedrick "Swab" Cotton, their cousin Wayne "PZ" Perry, and high school friend Jay "J-Dante" Green, all graduates of Lamar High School in Houston. The group is best known for the hit songs "Creep Inn", "Get Gone", and "Whatever".

Career
Ideal's eponymous debut album was released by Virgin Records on August 24, 1999. The album sold 615,000 units in the U.S., according to Nielsen SoundScan, and was certified Gold by the RIAA. Allmusic's Heather Phares called Ideal's initial effort a "heartfelt first album" which showcased the "group's smooth, sensuous vocal styling and romantic songwriting".

In 2004, the group signed with Neutral Ground/Universal Records and began work on their sophomore album, tentatively titled From Now On. Guest producers for the project were to include Bryan-Michael Cox, Rockwilder, Nisan Stewart, Mike City, and Battle Cat. The lead single was slated to be the Cee-Lo Green–featured "Makin' Time", however neither the single nor the album were released.

Cedrick "Swab" Cotton (born on May 31, 1974 in Houston, Texas) was fatally stabbed at a convenience store in Houston on February 9, 2021. He was 46.

Discography and chart performance

Albums

Singles

References

External links
 

1995 establishments in Texas
2004 disestablishments in Texas
American contemporary R&B musical groups
African-American musical groups
Musical groups from Houston
American boy bands
Virgin Records artists
Universal Records artists
Musical groups established in 1995
Musical groups disestablished in 2004